Il Milanese Imbruttito (Italian for The Disgruntled Milanese) it's an Italian satirical blog and YouTube channel parodizing the stereotypical traits, habits and catchphrases of the work-centered lifestyle of people living and working in Milan. It has been launched in 2013, and by 2017 it had grown a following of about 1.5 million viewers and readers, becoming an internet phenomenon in Italy. The three founders and authors are Marco De Crescenzio, Federico Marisio and Tommaso Pozza.

The YouTube channel hosts different types of content. The interviste imbruttite segment is a series of interviews to passersby. A few years after the launch of the channel, scripted fictional episodes were also introduced, with actor Germano Lanzoni playing the role of a stereotipical Milan small-businessman.

In 2016 Italian traditional publisher Rizzoli published Milanesità, istruzioni per l’uso ("Milaneseness, instruction manual"), the second book on the subject by the Milanese Imbruttito authors. In 2018 it also debutted in theaters with a comedy play co-authored by Lanzoni and director Walter Leonardi.

See also
 Office Space (1999 black comedy movie satirizing 9-to-5 work life)

Notes

References
 Claudio Moschin (2019) Fenomeno social - Siamo noi "Il Milanese Imbruttito", 27.10.2019, tvsvizzera.it
 Linda Parrinello, Vito Sinopoli (2019) Figa & Fatturato: intervista a Germano Lanzoni, 17.10.2019, businesspeople.it
 Francesca Di Adamo (2018) Il Milanese Imbruttito: la comicità nei contenuti raccontata da Germano Lanzoni, 9.12.2018, digital-coach.it, versione archiviata su web.archive.org
 Rosanna Scardi (2018) Tra «giargiana» e «circonvalla»: al Maite il Milanese Imbruttito, 14.11.2018, bergamo.corriere.it
 Daniel Settembre (2019) Il Milanese Imbruttito da Facebook al fatturato. Raccontato dai 3 fondatori, Forbes.it, 11.11.2019
 Giuseppe di Matteo (2016) Il Milanese Imbruttito colpisce ancora, 13.10.2016, ilgiorno.it
 Francesca Galici (2020) I "pippistrilli" e le "multinagionali": quell'Italia che non crede al virus - Il Milanese Imbruttito sbarca a Gallipoli, 31/07/2020, ilgiornale.it
 Pier Luigi Vercesi (2020) Il Milanese Imbruttito: «La satira rende la società più libera», 24.2.2020, corriere.it
 Stefania Leo (2020) Milanese Imbruttito: «Il Coronavirus non fermerà la nostra voglia di fatturare»

External links
 Official website and blog
 Official youtube channel

Italian comedy
Comedy-related YouTube channels
Parody social media accounts
Italian Internet celebrities
Italian bloggers
Male bloggers
Italian satire
Cultural depictions of Italian people